Chief Santos is a football club in Tsumeb, Namibia. The club was formerly part of the Namibia Premier League, but was relegated to the second league in 2005. The club has been promoted back to the Premier League under the management of Mohammed Ouseb, in 2008. They returned to the Premier League again in 2016, taking the victory in their final North East First Division match.

Achievements
Namibia Premier League: 2
1993, 2003

NFA-Cup: 4
1991, 1998, 1999, 2000

Performance in CAF competitions
African Cup of Champions Clubs: 1 appearance
1994 – Preliminary Round

CAF Cup: 1 appearance
1997 – withdrew in First Round

CAF Cup Winners' Cup: 2 appearances
1992 – withdrew in Preliminary Round
2000 – Preliminary Round

References

1963 establishments in South West Africa
Association football clubs established in 1963
Football clubs in Namibia
Namibia Premier League clubs
Tsumeb